Callianira can refer to:
 one of the Nereids, sea-nymphs in Greek mythology
 Callianira (ctenophore), a genus of tentaculate comb jellies, established by Péron and Lesueur in 1810
 Callianira, an invalid butterfly genus established by Hübner around 1819, now in Limenitis
 Callianira, an invalid butterfly genus established by Doubleday in 1847, now in Eunica